The Hartford Dark Blues were a Major League Baseball club in the 1870s, based in Hartford, Connecticut for three seasons and in Brooklyn, New York for one. During  the team played home games at the Union Grounds in Brooklyn and was sometimes called the Brooklyn Hartfords.

The team's owner, Morgan Bulkeley, who later became the first president of the NL in 1876, established the franchise in 1874; he gave the on-field captain duties to Lip Pike, who was also the starting center fielder.  Among the other players signed by Hartford were pitcher Cherokee Fisher, who had led the NA in earned run average the two previous seasons, second baseman Bob Addy, and Scott Hastings.

After placing seventh among the league's eight teams, the team's roster was purged and captain duties were handed over to third baseman Bob Ferguson, who stayed in the role for the remaining three seasons of the franchise's existence.  The change in personnel, which included the pitching additions of future Hall of Famer Candy Cummings and Tommy Bond, improved the team's results.  With the team's pitching rotation stable, and the hitting of Tom Carey, Tom York, Dick Higham, and Jack Burdock, the franchise enjoyed second-place finishes in 1875 and 1876.

Following the departure of their pitching stars, Cummings and Bond, the team had to rely on Terry Larkin in 1877, who shouldered most of the pitching duties.  The Dark Blues finished in third place, despite the hitting of John Cassidy, who batted .378.  When Bulkeley moved his team to Brooklyn in 1877, he expected that he would make a better profit than he had in Hartford.  The larger population of Brooklyn did not, however, respond in kind, and the Hartfords' fan base did not increase.  He became disenchanted with his involvement in baseball, and with his interest in running the day-to-day operations of the team.  Because of this and the lack of fan support, the team disbanded after the 1877 season.

Keys

List of players

References
General
Melville, Tom. 2001. Early baseball and the rise of the National League. McFarland. .
Specific

External links
Baseball Reference

Major League Baseball all-time rosters